Mykóla Oleksándrovyč Kapustjáns’kyj (February 1, 1879 – February 19, 1969) was a General in the army of the Ukrainian National Republic and one of the founders of the Organization of Ukrainian Nationalists. Kapustiansky was born in Yekaterinoslav Governorate (in present-day Dnipropetrovsk Oblast) in central Ukraine, then part of the Russian Empire. He fought in the Russian-Japanese War and in 1912 graduated from the General Staff Academy in Saint Petersburg, reaching the rank of colonel during the First World War. After the Revolution of 1917 Kapustiansky joined the Ukrainian units of the Russian army and rose rapidly in its ranks, becoming chief of staff of the First Division of the First Ukrainian Corps in August 1917, and in early 1918 chief of staff of the southwestern front. Under the Directory of the Ukrainian National Republic, he served as operations chief and then as general quartermaster of the Army of the Ukrainian National Republic. In 1920, he was promoted to brigadier general.

After the war, Kapustiansky emigrated to Poland and then to France. Kapustiansky was a founder of the Organization of Ukrainian Nationalists and a member of its Provid, or Directorate, from 1929 until his death in 1969. During the rift between Andriy Melnyk and Stepan Bandera within the OUN, he took the side of the more moderate and conservative Melnyk. When the Germans occupied Ukraine during the Second World War, Kapustinsky served as vice-president of the Ukrainian National Council in Kiev but was later arrested and imprisoned by the Germans. During World War II, he cooperated with the Nazis and tried to establish a Ukrainian section in the Wehrmacht. After the war, he settled in Munich and became the first chief of the military section of the Government-in-exile of the Ukrainian National Republic. He wrote Pokhid ukraïns’kykh armii na Kyïv–Odesu v 1919 rotsi (The March of Ukrainian Armies on Kiev–Odessa in 1919; 1922, 2nd edn 1946) and numerous articles on military affairs.

Honour and awards
 Imperial Order of St. Vladimir, 4th class with swords and bows
 Order of St. Anne, 4th class
 Order of St. Stanislaus, 2nd and 3rd classes

Notes

1879 births
1969 deaths
People from Dnipropetrovsk Oblast
People from Yekaterinoslav Governorate
Organization of Ukrainian Nationalists politicians
Generals of the Ukrainian People's Republic
Russian military personnel of the Russo-Japanese War
Russian military personnel of World War I
Ukrainian people of World War I
Ukrainian nationalists
Ukrainian people of World War II
Ukrainian politicians before 1991
Ukrainian refugees
Recipients of the Order of St. Anna, 4th class
Recipients of the Order of St. Vladimir, 4th class
Ukrainian collaborators with Nazi Germany